CA9, CA 9, CA-9 or Ca.9 may refer to:
California State Route 9, a highway in the US state of California
California's 9th congressional district
The U.S. Court of Appeals for the Ninth Circuit
Carbonic anhydrase 9, an enzyme
Caproni Ca.9, an airplane model from the early 1910s